Helicopter Maritime Strike Squadron Three Seven (HSM-37) "Easyriders" is a United States Navy helicopter squadron based at Marine Corps Base Hawaii. HSM-37 provides helicopter resources for all s and s based at Pearl Harbor. The squadron was established as Helicopter Anti-Submarine Squadron (Light) Three Seven (HSL-37) on 3 July 1975 and was redesignated HSM-37 on 1 October 2013.

History
HSL-37 was established on 3 July 1975 at Naval Air Station Barbers Point. It became the first U.S. Navy squadron to transition from the SH-2F Seasprite to the SH-60B Seahawk on 6 February 1992. The squadron moved from NAS Barbers Point to Marine Corps Base Hawaii on Kāneʻohe Bay in February 1999. It was redesignated HSM-37 on 1 October 2013 as it began to transition from the SH-60B Seahawk to the MH-60R Seahawk. The first four MH-60Rs were delivered in September 2013. Its last SH-60B was retired on 3 February 2015.

HSM-37 is currently the largest expeditionary helicopter squadron in the U.S. Navy, operating fifteen MH-60R Seahawks for deployment on destroyers or cruisers.

Squadron aircraft
SH-2F Seasprite, 1975–1992 
SH-60 Seahawk
SH-60B, 1992–2015 (redesignated HSM-37 on 1 October 2013)
MH-60R, 2013–Present

See also
 History of the United States Navy
 List of United States Navy aircraft squadrons

References

External links

 Official HSM-37 webpage
 Official US Navy webpage

Military units and formations in Hawaii
Helicopter maritime strike squadrons of the United States Navy